Euclid was a small unincorporated community in the former county of Princess Anne County, Virginia, now known as Virginia Beach. Euclid is located at an elevation of 16 feet above sea level.

References

See also 

 List of former counties, cities, and towns of Virginia

Unincorporated communities in Virginia
Former populated places in Virginia